Eye to Eye is an American detective drama series that aired on Thursday nights from March 21 to May 2, 1985.

Premise
When the ex-partner of semi-retired private eye Oscar Poole is murdered, the man's daughter, Tracy Doyle, becomes Oscar's new partner.

Cast
Charles Durning as Oscar Poole
Stephanie Faracy as Tracy Doyle

Episodes

References

External links

1985 American television series debuts
1985 American television series endings
English-language television shows
American Broadcasting Company original programming
Television shows set in Los Angeles
1980s American crime drama television series
Television series by Warner Bros. Television Studios